Troy Elderon Hudson (born March 13, 1976) is an American retired professional basketball point guard. He played 11 years in the National Basketball Association (NBA) after going undrafted in 1997. He averaged a career-high 14.2 points per game with the Minnesota Timberwolves in the 2002–03 season.

College career
Hudson played basketball at the University of Missouri and Southern Illinois University, but his college career finished in his junior year.

Professional career

Yakima SunKings (1997–1998) 
Hudson was not selected in the 1997 NBA draft, and played his first season in the Continental Basketball Association for the Yakima SunKings.

Utah Jazz (1998) 
Hudson earned a hard-fought spot on the Utah Jazz in 1998, which only lasted two months.

Los Angeles Clippers, Sioux Falls Skyforce, and Orlando Magic (1998–2002) 
Hudson played for the Los Angeles Clippers (also playing during the short-lived 1999 season in the CBA for the Sioux Falls Skyforce) and the Orlando Magic, where he first developed into an important player, averaging 12 points and 3 assists per game during 2001–02, while appearing in 81 games.

Minnesota Timberwolves (2002–2007) 
However, Hudson's most productive seasons came with the Minnesota Timberwolves, where he averaged a career-best 14.2 pts and 5.7 assists in 2002–03, also receiving the nickname "Laker Killer" for his outstanding postseason play against the Los Angeles Lakers, where he increased his numbers to 23.5 points in a 2–4 first-round loss.

After landing a lucrative contract extension in 2003, Hudson was plagued by nagging injuries that subsequently hurt his production, as he only appeared in 70 games from 2005–07 combined. His contract with the Timberwolves was bought out on August 3, 2007.

Golden State Warriors (2007–2008) 
Originally signed to the Golden State Warriors on September 24, 2007, Hudson appeared in only nine games in the 2007–08 season. Following hip surgery on January 10, 2008, he was waived by the Warriors on January 29, to make room for Chris Webber, averaging 9.0 points per game throughout his NBA career.

Return to Sioux Falls (2012–2013) 
On October 31, 2012, Hudson signed with the Sioux Falls Skyforce of the NBA D-League. After struggling with injuries, he decided to retire at the end of January 2013.

Music career 
Hudson released one major album, Undrafted, also having recorded around 800 songs. A drum machine usually accompanies him on road trips. "I have my own label — Nutty Boyz Entertainment — and I have three artists (that I manage)", he said in an interview. However, the albums were not big sellers, with Hudson only selling 78 copies of his own in its first week of sales.

NBA career statistics

Regular season 

|-
| align="left" | 1997–98
| align="left" | Utah
| 8 || 0 || 2.9 || .429 || .000 || .000 || .3 || .5 || .2 || .0 || 1.5
|-
| align="left" | 1998–99
| align="left" | L.A. Clippers
| 25 || 6 || 21.0 || .400 || .319 || .895 || 2.2 || 3.7 || .4 || .1 || 6.8
|-
| align="left" | 1999–00
| align="left" | L.A. Clippers
| 62 || 38 || 25.7 || .377 || .311 || .811 || 2.4 || 3.9 || .7 || .0 || 8.8
|-
| align="left" | 2000–01
| align="left" | Orlando
| 75 || 7 || 13.4 || .336 || .202 || .817 || 1.4 || 2.2 || .5 || .0 || 4.8
|-
| align="left" | 2001–02
| align="left" | Orlando
| 81 || 4 || 22.9 || .434 || .353 || .876 || 1.8 || 3.1 || .7 || .1 || 11.7
|-
| align="left" | 2002–03
| align="left" | Minnesota
| 79 || 74 || 32.9 || .428 || .365 || .900 || 2.3 || 5.7 || .8 || .1 || 14.2
|-
| align="left" | 2003–04
| align="left" | Minnesota
| 29 || 1 || 17.3 || .386 || .403 || .818 || 1.2 || 2.4 || .2 || .0 || 7.5
|-
| align="left" | 2004–05
| align="left" | Minnesota
| 79 || 32 || 21.9 || .401 || .345 || .778 || 1.3 || 3.6 || .3 || .1 || 8.7
|-
| align="left" | 2005–06
| align="left" | Minnesota
| 36 || 0 || 22.2 || .381 || .396 || .923 || 1.2 || 2.9 || .3 || .1 || 9.5
|-
| align="left" | 2006–07
| align="left" | Minnesota
| 34 || 6 || 16.3 || .379 || .350 || .813 || 1.4 || 2.1 || .4 || .1 || 5.9
|-
| align="left" | 2007–08
| align="left" | Golden State
| 9 || 0 || 10.3 || .290 || .333 || 1.000 || .8 || 1.0 || .3 || .0 || 3.1
|- class="sortbottom"
| style="text-align:center;" colspan="2"| Career
| 517 || 168 || 21.8 || .401 || .339 || .858 || 1.7 || 3.4 || .5 || .0 || 9.0

Playoffs 

|-
| align="left" | 2001
| align="left" | Orlando
| 4 || 0 || 14.0 || .286 || .000 || .833 || 2.3 || 2.3 || .2 || .0 || 4.3
|-
| align="left" | 2002
| align="left" | Orlando
| 4 || 0 || 26.5 || .375 || .000 || .938 || 1.0 || 1.5 || .0 || .0 || 12.8
|-
| align="left" | 2003
| align="left" | Minnesota
| 6 || 6 || 36.8 || .415 || .436 || .947 || 2.0 || 5.5 || 1.3 || .0 || 23.5
|- class="sortbottom"
| style="text-align:center;" colspan="2"| Career
| 14 || 6 || 27.4 || .389 || .362 || .933 || 1.8 || 3.4 || .6 || .0 || 14.9

References

External links

NBA profile
NBA D-League Profile

Official website

1976 births
Living people
American men's basketball players
Basketball players from Illinois
Golden State Warriors players
Los Angeles Clippers players
Minnesota Timberwolves players
Missouri Tigers men's basketball players
Orlando Magic players
People from Carbondale, Illinois
Point guards
Midwest hip hop musicians
Rappers from Illinois
Sioux Falls Skyforce (CBA) players
Sioux Falls Skyforce players
Southern Illinois Salukis men's basketball players
Undrafted National Basketball Association players
Utah Jazz players
Yakima Sun Kings players
21st-century American rappers